Pseudojuloides is a genus of wrasses native to the Indian and Pacific Oceans.

Species
There are currently 16 recognized species in this genus:
 Pseudojuloides argyreogaster (Günther, 1867)
 Pseudojuloides atavai J. E. Randall & H. A. Randall, 1981 (Polynesian pencil wrasse)
 Pseudojuloides cerasinus (Snyder, 1904) (Small-tail pencil wrasse)
 Pseudojuloides edwardi Victor & J. E. Randall, 2014  (Mombasa pencil wrasse)
 Pseudojuloides elongatus Ayling & B. C. Russell, 1977 (Long-green pencil wrasse)
 Pseudojuloides erythrops J. E. Randall & H. A. Randall, 1981 (Red-eye pencil wrasse)
 Pseudojuloides kaleidos Kuiter & J. E. Randall, 1995 (Kaleidos pencil wrasse)
 Pseudojuloides labyrinthus Victor & J. M. B. Edward, 2016 (Labyrinth pencil wrasse) 
 Pseudojuloides mesostigma J. E. Randall & H. A. Randall, 1981 (Side-spot pencil wrasse)
 Pseudojuloides polackorum Connell, Victor & J. E. Randall, 2015 
 Pseudojuloides polynesica Victor, 2017 (Polynesian pencil wrasse) 
 Pseudojuloides pyrius J. E. Randall & H. A. Randall, 1981
 Pseudojuloides severnsi Bellwood & J. E. Randall, 2000 (Severns' pencil wrasse)
 Pseudojuloides splendens Victor, 2017 (Splendid pencil wrasse) 
 Pseudojuloides xanthomos J. E. Randall & H. A. Randall, 1981
 Pseudojuloides zeus Victor & J. M. B. Edward, 2015 (Zeus pencil wrasse)

References

 
Labridae
Marine fish genera
Taxa named by Henry Weed Fowler